"With You" is a song written Ronald Muir and Larry Shell, and recorded by American country music artist Charly McClain.  It was released in October 1982 as the second single from the album Too Good to Hurry.  The song reached No. 7 on the Billboard Hot Country Singles & Tracks chart.

Chart performance

References

1982 singles
Charly McClain songs
Epic Records singles
1982 songs
Songs written by Larry Shell